The 2015 German Athletics Championships were held at the Frankenstadion in Nuremberg on 25–26 July 2015.

Results

Men

Women

Notes

References

External links
 Official website

2015
German Athletics Championships
Athletics Championships